The 1995 Campionati Internazionali di San Marino was a men's tennis tournament played on outdoor clay courts at the Centro Tennis Cassa di Risparmio di Fonte dell'Ovo in the City of San Marino in San Marino and was part of the World Series of the 1995 ATP Tour. It was the seventh edition of the tournament and was held from 7 August until 13 August 1995. First-seeded Thomas Muster, who entered the main draw on a wildcard, won the singles title, his second at the event after 1993.

Finals

Singles

 Thomas Muster defeated  Andrea Gaudenzi 6–2, 6–0
 It was Muster's 9th title of the year and the 32nd of his career.

Doubles

 Jordi Arrese /  Andrew Kratzmann defeated  Pablo Albano /  Federico Mordegan 7–6, 3–6, 6–2

References

External links
 ITF tournament edition details

Campionati Internazionali di San Marino
San Marino CEPU Open
1995 in Sammarinese sport